Interlingue and Interlingua are constructed international auxiliary languages.

Nomenclature 
Interlingu- applies to three international auxiliary languages:

 Interlingua de Peano, published by the Italian mathematician Giuseppe Peano in 1903 and known most commonly as Latino sine flexione (Latin without inflections).
 Interlingue, published by Edgar de Wahl in 1922 and officially known as Occidental until 1949.
 Interlingua de IALA, published by the International Auxiliary Language Association (IALA) in 1951.

To avoid confusion, this article refers to Interlingue as Occidental until the name change in 1949 and Occidental-Interlingue afterwards, Interlingua de IALA as Interlingua, and any references to Interlingua de Peano as Latino sine flexione.

History 
Approximately 30 years older than Interlingua, the beginnings of Occidental-Interlingue reach back to 1894 when its founder Edgar de Wahl, until then an active Esperantist and one of its pioneers, chose to leave the language and begin creating his own after the vote in 1894 to reform the language failed. De Wahl spent the years in between collaborating with other auxiliary language creators and working on his own language, which appeared for the first time in the book Transcendental Algebra by Estonian linguist Jakob Linzbach in 1921, followed by its announcement in the magazine Kosmoglott in February the following year.

The beginnings of Interlingua reach back to 1924 and the foundation of the IALA by Alice Vanderbilt Morris and her husband Dave Hennen Morris. While the IALA originally did not intend to create its own language, it began showing an interest in the possibility in the years after 1934 when it rejected the idea of a completely schematic auxiliary language, leaning towards a naturalistic language; at this time it began creating models for languages based on schematic languages like Ido and naturalistic languages like Occidental to aid it in deciding on which language model to adopt.

Vocabulary and linguistic character 

Both Occidental-Interlingue and Interlingua are naturalistic constructed languages based on common Western European vocabulary, and share approximately 90% the same vocabulary when orthographic differences and final vowels (filisofie vs. philosophia for example) are not taken into account. Despite this, prominent supporters of both Occidental-Interlingue and Interlingua saw the similar vocabulary as superficial, and unrelated to the inherent character of their languages. Alexander Gode, one of the creators of Interlingua, believed that its grouping with Peano's Latino sine Flexione and Occidental-Interlingue as naturalistic planned languages was done "according to exclusively superficial and external similarities", and that it was the "idealism" of de Wahl that "prevented him from freeing himself from traditional Esperantism", an idealism that he defined as "subordinating the observed facts to the preconceived idea and ideal of what an auxiliary language should be."

Derivation from verbs in Occidental-Interlingue is regularized as much as possible using De Wahl's rule, while in Interlingua such a rule does not exist and so-called Latin double stem verbs (e.g. scriber to script-) are brought in without changes.

Orthography 
Interlingua uses traditional Greco-Roman orthography with digraphs such as ph and th, the vocalic y and doubled consonants (e.g. tyranno, emphatic and Christo instead of tirano, emfatic and Cristo). A so-called collateral orthography exists for those who prefer a simplified spelling.

Grammar 
Both Occidental-Interlingue and Interlingua are promoted as languages with an international vocabulary and minimal grammar, and a form of "modern Latin".

A comparison of the basic grammar between the two languages (cited from the Grammatica de Interlingue in Interlingue by Dr. F. Haas and A Grammar of Interlingua by Alexander Gode and Hugh Blair) is as follows:

Correlatives 
The correlatives for both languages tend to follow a q-, t-, and al- distinction in which Occidental-Interlingue "tries to retain regularity as well", while in some parts Interlingua is more regular than Occidental (the universal series with omne), while in others not (e.g., the temporal series). Correlatives considered regular by Federico Gobbo in the source are indicated in bold.

Mutual influence 
A certain amount of influence has taken place between the two languages.

Influence of Interlingua on Occidental-Interlingue 
After the standardization of Occidental in 1947 and the renaming to Interlingue there was a push towards more naturalistic forms, particularly by Ric Berger, who advocated replacing the optional -i adjectival ending with -e. After advocating for the change in April 1949 he began implementing it the following month in his own writing and most of the content in Cosmoglotta, in addition to other changes such as nostre (our) and vostre (your) instead of nor and vor. The following April he defended the changes, denying that they were a "concession to the IALA" but instead a simple "concession to the general tendency towards greater naturalism found today in the interlinguistic movement", calling critics of the changes victims of "long-lasting habits" and an "optical illusion". Berger left his position as editor of Cosmoglotta soon after and eventually joined Interlingua in 1956.

Influence of Occidental-Interlingue on Interlingua

Samples

Lord's Prayer

Sample text by Dr. F. Haas in 1957

References 

Comparison of constructed languages
Interlingue
Interlingua